This is the results breakdown of the 2011 Turkish general election.

Largest party by province 
The following table is a complete list of provinces changing hands as a result of the election based on the notional results of the 2002 and 2007 elections, notwithstanding the results of 2003 by-election in Siirt.

Results by provinces

Adana

Adıyaman

Afyonkarahisar

Ağrı

Aksaray

Amasya

Ankara

Region 1

Region 2

Antalya

Ardahan

Artvin

Aydın

Balıkesir

Bartın

Batman

Bayburt

Bilecik

Bingöl

Bitlis

Bolu

Burdur

Bursa

Çanakkale

Çankırı

Çorum

Denizli

Diyarbakır

Düzce

Edirne

Elazığ

Erzincan

Erzurum

Eskişehir

Gaziantep

Giresun

Gümüşhane

Hakkari

Hatay

Iğdır

Isparta

İstanbul

Region 1

Region 2

Region 3

İzmir

Region 1

Region 2

Kahramanmaraş

Karabük

Karaman

Kars

Kastamonu

Kayseri

Kırıkkale

Kırklareli

Kırşehir

Kilis

Kocaeli

Konya

Kütahya

Malatya

Manisa

Mardin

Mersin

Muğla

Muş

Nevşehir

Niğde

Ordu

Osmaniye

Rize

Sakarya

Samsun

Siirt

Sinop

Sivas

Şırnak

Tekirdağ

Tokat

Trabzon

Tunceli

Şanlıurfa

Uşak

Van

Yalova

Yozgat

Zonguldak

External links 
 Official results Supreme Electoral Council 

2011 Turkish general election
Election results in Turkey